The Fairchild M-84 was a four-seat cabin aircraft designed using PT-19 components.

Design and development
With a large number of surplus trainers available on the post-Second World War market, Fairchild sought a way to modify its existing M-62 trainer and tooling into a four-place personal aircraft. The M-62 was a low-wing, fixed landing gear, open cockpit aircraft. The steel-tube fuselage was widened, a cabin structure was added and retractable landing gear were retrofitted using many of the same gear leg and strut parts. The wing outer panels and tail section remained unchanged. An inline engine installation was initially designed, but a Continental Motors radial was installed. With the introduction of the Beechcraft Bonanza, Ryan Navion, Bellanca Cruisair and the TEMCO F-24 at about the same time, the market was considered too saturated to produce the M-84.

Operational history
The first flight occurred in December 1945. The prototype was used as an executive transport for five years. On 29 May 1951, the M-84 was donated to Washington County, Maryland with chief pilot Richard A. Henson taxiing the aircraft to the Hagerstown High School in a parade. The aircraft was never used for education and eventually was scrapped after years of vandalism.

Specifications (M-84)

See also

References

External links
Image of a M-84

Fairchild aircraft